Kakkiyar is a tributary of the Pamba River, the third longest river in the South Indian state of Kerala.

Rivers of Pathanamthitta district
Pamba River